The Ministry of Foreign Affairs (Sinhala: විදේශ කටයුතු අමාත්‍යාංශය Vidhesha Katayuthu  Amathyanshaya; Tamil: வெளிநாட்டலுவல்கள் அமைச்சு) (also known as the Foreign Ministry or External Affairs Ministry) is a cabinet ministry of the Government of Sri Lanka responsible for conducting and managing Sri Lanka's foreign relations through oversight of its missions abroad via the Sri Lanka Overseas Service, as well as drafting and general implementation of the nation's foreign policy.

History
The ministry was formally established in 1948 following the independence of Ceylon as the Ministry of External Affairs and Defence, coming under the direct control of the Prime Minister of Ceylon. In 1977 the government led by J.R Jayawardena divided the ministry in two, forming the Ministry of Defence and the Ministry of External Affairs. A.C.S Hameed was appointed as the first minister of External Affairs on 23 July 1977.

Overseas missions

The ministry has 65 overseas missions including 13 High Commissions, a Deputy High Commission, 37 Embassies, 2 Permanent Representations to the United Nations, 11 consulates and a representative office. It provides consular assistance to Sri Lankans traveling, working and studying overseas.

Divisions
 General Administration Division
 Overseas Administration Division
 Consular Affairs Division
 Protocol Division
 Public Diplomacy  Division
 Economic Affairs Division
 Finance Division
 IT Division
 Legal Division
 United Nations and Multilateral Affairs Division
 South Asia and SAARC Division
 Middle East and Africa Division
 Europe, Americas and CIS Division
 East Asia and Pacific Division

Ministers of Foreign Affairs

Permanent Secretaries

 Bernard Tilakaratna, SLOS
 Rodney Vandergert, SLOS
 Wilhelm Woutersz, SLOS
 R. C. Vendargart, SLOS
 Lionel Fernando, SLAS 
 G. Wijesiri, SLOS 
 Nihal Rodrigo, SLOS 
 B. A. B. Goonetilleke, SLOS 
 H. M. G. S. Palihakkara, SLOS
 Dr. Palitha T.B. Kohona
 Karunatilaka Amunugama, SLOS
 Kshenuka Seneviratne, SLOS
 Esala Weerakoon, SLOS
 Prasad Kariyawasam, SLOS
 Ravinatha Aryasinha, SLOS
 Jayanath Colombage, SLOS
 Aruni Wijewardane

See also
 Foreign relations of Sri Lanka
 Ministries of Sri Lanka

References

External links
 Government of Sri Lanka
 Official Website of Ministry of Foreign Affairs
 Permanent Mission of Sri Lanka to the United Nations Office at Geneva 
  The Lakshman Kadirgamar Institute of International Relations and Strategic Studies
 A Sri Lankan Diplomatic Success Story in the 18th Century

Foreign Affairs

Sri Lanka
Sri Lanka, Foreign Affairs